Pir Bolagh may refer to:

 Pir Bolagh, Jolfa, a village in Jolfa County, Iran
 Pir Bolagh, Ardabil, a village in Ardabil County, Iran
 Pirbulaq, a village in Azerbaijan